Tutelary may refer to:

 Patron saint, or tutelary saint
 Tutelary deity

See also
 Tutoring